Osburh (or Osburga) was an Anglo-Saxon saint who rested at Coventry Cathedral. Although there is some tradition holding her to be an early 11th-century abbess of Coventry Abbey, it is suspected that her cult predates the Viking Age.

A 14th-century note in MS Bodley 438 mentions an early nunnery at Coventry. The 15th-century writer John Rous related that Cnut the Great destroyed the old Coventry minster, and noted that the "holy virgin Osburga now laid there in a noble shrine" (probably lay in the south transept of the church). As the Anglo-Saxon Chronicle records the devastation of neighbouring Warwickshire in 1016, Cnut's attack on a monastery at Coventry is possible.

Leofric's 1043 Coventry charter relates that the abbey was dedicated to Osburh (as well as St Mary, St Peter and All Saints), though this could be a later addition. Osburh was said to rest at Coventry in the 12th-century resting-place list of Hugh Candidus.

She is mentioned the 13th-century Scandinavian Ribe Martyrology, which gives 21 January as her feast-day.  According to a description of Coventry's relics made in 1539, her head was enclosed with copper and gold.

See also
 St Osburg's Church, Coventry

Notes

References

 
 

Anglo-Saxon abbesses
Mercian saints